Lê Văn Tiết is a former international table tennis player from Vietnam.

Table tennis career
He won a bronze medal at the 1959 World Table Tennis Championships in the Swaythling Cup (men's team event) for South Vietnam with Mai Văn Hòa, Trần Cảnh Được and Trần Văn Liễu.

He started playing table tennis aged 8 in Saigon. He won the 1954-55 national title and won three Asian Games medals. He retired in 1975.

See also
 List of table tennis players
 List of World Table Tennis Championships medalists

References

Vietnamese table tennis players
1939 births
Asian Games gold medalists for Vietnam
Asian Games bronze medalists for Vietnam
Asian Games medalists in table tennis
Table tennis players at the 1958 Asian Games
Table tennis players at the 1962 Asian Games
Medalists at the 1958 Asian Games
Medalists at the 1962 Asian Games
Living people
World Table Tennis Championships medalists
20th-century Vietnamese people